The 2007 European Rally Championship season was the 55th season of the FIA European Rally Championship. French driver Simon Jean-Joseph won his second European rally championship title despite not winning any of the 10 events.

Calendar and winners
The calendar of the 2007 European rally championship season consisted of 10 events.

Championship standings
For the final classification in a rally, the winner was awarded 10 points, the runner-up 8 and the third placed driver 6. Drivers ranked 4 to 8 got 5–4–3–2–1 point(s). Additionally, the top three of every leg got 3–2–1 point(s). Only drivers who participated in least 6 events qualified for the championship ranking.

References

European Rally Championship
European Rally Championship seasons
Rally